The 1992 Cornell Big Red football team was an American football team that represented Cornell University during the 1992 NCAA Division I-AA football season. Cornell finished fourth in the Ivy League. 

In its third season under head coach Jim Hofher, the team compiled a 7–3 record and outscored opponents 263 to 183. Team captains were John Massy, Scott Oliaro and Jeff Woodring. 

Cornell's 4–3 conference record placed fourth in the Ivy League standings. The Big Red outscored Ivy opponents 165 to 120.

Cornell played its home games at Schoellkopf Field in Ithaca, New York.

Schedule

References

Cornell
Cornell Big Red football seasons
Cornell Big Red football